Chicago 19 is the sixteenth studio album by American rock band Chicago, released in 1988. After recording Chicago 18 with David Foster, the band worked primarily with producers Ron Nevison and Chas Sandford for this album. Their Full Moon Records imprint moved to Reprise Records. This is the final album to feature the band's original drummer Danny Seraphine, who was dismissed from the group in 1990.

Background
With a reception similar to its predecessor, Chicago 19 became a success on the album chart, going platinum and yielding several hit singles. The album includes "Look Away" (No. 1), "I Don't Wanna Live Without Your Love" (No. 3), and "You're Not Alone" (No. 10). A remixed version of Jason Scheff's "What Kind of Man Would I Be?" (No. 5) would also be successful in late 1989 as part of the follow-up Greatest Hits 1982-1989 release. The album relied heavily on outside writers with five of its ten compositions. The first two singles were either written or co-written by Diane Warren, and the third by British-born songwriter Jimmy Scott.

After the tour for Chicago 19, original drummer Danny Seraphine was fired from the band for undisclosed reasons. Session drummer Tris Imboden then joined the band, in time to record "Explain It to My Heart" (the last song recorded for the album) on Twenty 1.

Track listing

Chicago 19 (Full Moon/Reprise 25714) reached #37 in the US during a chart stay of 42 weeks. It did not chart in the UK.

Outtakes
An alternate version of "Come in from the Night" exists called "Hide Behind the Window". A cover version of Otis Redding's "I Can't Turn You Loose" was intended for Chicago 19 and was performed live in July 1988. "Dancing in The Streets" was omitted, and performed in 1989 in Houston, Texas as part of an encore; Wilson Pickett's "In the Midnight Hour" was also performed at the same show.

Personnel

Chicago 
 Bill Champlin – keyboards, lead and backing vocals
 Robert Lamm – keyboards, lead and backing vocals
 Lee Loughnane – trumpet, brass arrangements
 James Pankow – trombone, brass arrangements
 Walter Parazaider – saxophone
 Jason Scheff – bass, lead and backing vocals
 Danny Seraphine – drums, percussion, programming
 Dawayne Bailey – guitar, backing vocals

Additional musicians 
 Chas Sandford – guitars
 Dann Huff – guitars
 Phillip Ashley – keyboards
 John Campbell – keyboards
 Charles Judge – keyboards 
 Kiki Ebsen – keyboards, programming
 Peter Kaye – programming
 Peter Maher – programming
 Mike Murphy – programming, cowbell, drum technician
 Efrain Toro – drum programming
 Paul Jamieson – drum technician
 Tamara Champlin – additional backing vocals
 Tim Feehan – additional backing vocals on "Heart In Pieces"

Production 
 Producers – Chas Sandford (Tracks 1, 3, 5, 7, 8 & 10); Ron Nevison (Tracks 2, 4, 6 & 9).
 Tracks 1, 3, 5, 7, 8, and 10 engineered by Gary McGachan and Chas Sandford, assisted by Daren Chadwick.
 Tracks 2, 4, 6, and 9 engineered by Ron Nevison, assisted by Nick Basich, Michael E. Hutchinson, Stan Katayama, Jeff Poe and Bob Vogt.
 Mixed by James Guthrie, Chas Sandford and Greg Walsh.
 Recorded and Mixed at Record Plant and Secret Sound (Los Angeles, CA); A&M Studios (Hollywood, CA); Gold Mine (Woodland Hills, CA); Can-Am Recorders (Tarzana, CA).
 Production Assistant to Ron Nevison – Deandra Miller
 Production Assistant to Chas Sandford – Lisa M. Allen
 Art Direction and Design – Janet Levinson
 Computer Illustration –Jim Hillin for DeGraf/Wahrman Inc.
 Direction – Howard Kaufman for Front Line Management

The album makes extensive use of the then popular Roland D-50 synthesizer presets. For example: "I Don't Wanna Live Without Your Love" with "Pressure Me Strings" and "Look Away" with PCM E-Piano.

Charts

Weekly charts

Singles - Billboard (U.S.)

References

External links
"Chicago 19" at discogs

Chicago (band) albums
1988 albums
Full Moon Records albums
Reprise Records albums
Albums produced by Ron Nevison